"Stood Up" is a song written by Dub Dickerson and Erma Herrold and performed by Ricky Nelson. The song reached #2 on the Billboard Hot 100, #4 on the R&B chart, #8 on the country chart, and #27 on the UK Singles Chart in 1957.  James Burton and Joe Maphis played guitar on the song, with Joe Maphis doing the guitar solo.

The song ranked #16 on Billboard magazine's Top 50 songs of 1958.

Other versions
Willie Nile released a version on his 1997 album, Live in Central Park.
Cliff Richard released a version on his 2013 album, The Fabulous Rock 'n' Roll Songbook.

References

1957 songs
1957 singles
Ricky Nelson songs
Cliff Richard songs
Imperial Records singles